Fred Meyer, Inc. is an American company founded in Portland, Oregon by Fred G. Meyer.

Fred or Frederick Meyer may also refer to:
Fred G. Meyer (1886–1978), German-born American businessman, founder of the Fred Meyer hypermarket chain
Fred Meyer (wrestler) (1900–1983), American Olympic wrestler
Fred Meyer (gymnast) (1910–1996), American gymnast
Fred Meyer Jewelers, an American chain of jewelers; a wholly owned subsidiary of Fred Meyer, Inc.
Fred Meyer (American football) (1919–1996), American football player
Frederick Meyer (1872–1961), German-born American designer and art educator
Frederick Herman Meyer (1876–1961), American architect
F. B. Meyer (Frederick Brotherton Meyer), Baptist pastor and evangelist in England
Freddy Meyer (Frederick A. Meyer IV), American ice hockey defenseman

See also
Fred Meijer (1919–2011), American businessman of Dutch descent, chairman of the Meijer hypermarket chain
Fred Mayer (disambiguation)
Fred Meyers (born 1983), American actor
Fred L. Myers, founder of Myers's Rum
Frederic Myers (1811–1851), English clergyman and author
Frederic W. H. Myers (1843–1901), English poet, classicist, philologist, and psychic researcher